Gruha Pravesam  is a 1982 Telugu-language drama film directed by Bairisetty Bhaskara Rao and produced by Yadavalli Vijayendra Reddy. The film stars Mohan Babu, Jayasudha, Gummadi, and Prabhakar Reddy. The film had musical score by Satyam. The film was remade in Kannada as Gruhapravesha.

Cast
Mohan Babu
Jayasudha
Gummadi
Ranganath
Giribabu
Prabhakar Reddy
Kavitha

Soundtrack 
Daari chupina devatha nee cheyi ennadu veedaka - Singer : Jesudas

Awards
Filmfare Awards South
 1982 - Jayasudha Won Filmfare Award for Best Actress - Telugu

Nandi Awards
 1982 - Nandi Award for Second Best Story Writer - M. Prabhakar Reddy

References

External links
 

1982 films
1980s Telugu-language films
Indian drama films
Telugu films remade in other languages